St Andrew's Church is situated in the village of Great Finborough, Suffolk, England. It is a Grade II listed building.

The church that stands today has been there since the Victorian period by Richard Phipson but there has been a place of worship on the site for over 1000 years.  In the year 1086 the church as well as Finborough Hall were recorded in the Domesday Book. In 1558, the first records of births deaths and marriages were recorded at the church. In 1883 a small wall was built around the graveyard of the church costing £5. Eventually the roof was damaged by lightning, and at another date the roof was damaged by gales at a cost of £10,000. The only original part of the church that still stands is the Tudor porch.

There is a lovely view from the west door of the church and the spire nearly reaches 300 ft.
Above the entrance there is a small niche with a notable statue of St Andrew, whose identity is clear because of the cross that he carries with him. Inside the church there is a large nave; the side chapel is filled with monuments dedicated to the Wollaston family who played a big part in the Finborough Estate. They owned the Estate for a century and there are monuments dedicated to nearly all the family members. The Pettiward family also played a big role, they took control of the estate after the Wollastons and owned it until the mid 1930s. There are still weekly church services at St Andrew's.

References

Church of England church buildings in Suffolk
Great Finborough